The 2017 S.League (also known as the Great Eastern Hyundai S.League for sponsorship reasons) was the 22nd season of the S.League, the top-flight Singaporean professional league for association football clubs, since its establishment in 1996. The season began on 26 February 2017, and concluded on 18 November 2017. Albirex Niigata (S) were the defending champions.

It was the final season with the "S.League" name as it was officially renamed to Singapore Premier League from the 2018 season onwards.

Teams 
A total of 9 teams competed in the league. Albirex Niigata (S) and DPMM FC were invited foreign clubs from Japan and Brunei respectively.

Stadiums and locations 

The opening game of the season which doubles up as the 2017 Singapore Community Shield was played at the National Stadium

Personnel and sponsors
Note: Flags indicate national team as has been defined under FIFA eligibility rules. Players may hold more than one non-FIFA nationality.

Coaching changes

Foreigners 
For the 2017 season, Local teams (Exclusive of the Young Lions, which is a development team) and Brunei DPMM are able to register up to a total of 3 foreign players in the main squad, and an additional player under the age of 21 for the Prime League. For match-day squads in the S-League, any three foreigners can be registered.

The mid season transfer window will be opened from 22 May 2017 and closed on 18 June 2017.

Players name in bold indicates the player was registered during the mid-season transfer window.

 For the 2017 season, it was decided that DPMM FC can sign an additional foreigner under the age of 21 which was not allowed in the past.  However, the same rules for match day squad will still apply.
 DPMM FC announced that François Marque was dropped from the S. League squad.  Although no reasons were given, it is presumed that he had suffered a long term injury in his 1st match for the team.
 Raspreet Sandhu is registered to play for AFC Cup competition only.
 Diego Silvas is registered for the S. League, taking up the Prime League slot.
 Foreign players who left their clubs or were de-registered from playing squad due to medical issues or other matters.
 Albirex Niigata (S) is an all-Japanese team and do not hire any foreigners.

Kits

League table

Positions by stage

Results

Season statistics

Top scorers
As of 18 November 2017.

Clean sheets
As of 18 November 2017.

Hat-tricks 

Note
4 Player scored 4 goals
5 Player scored 5 goals

Own goals

Penalty missed

Discipline – club

Discipline – player

1) Madhu Mohana was handed a suspended $1,000 fine for his comments on social media directed at referee Sukhbir Singh after they lost to Albirex in the Charity Shield.

2) Raihan Rahman was charged for allegedly using a racial slur on Warriors forward Jordan Webb during an S.League match between Balestier and Warriors on 28/2/2017.  He was acquitted of that charge after a Football Association of Singapore Disciplinary Committee (DC) hearing.

S.League Awards night winners

References

External links 

2017
1
2017 domestic association football leagues